54321 is a 2016 Tamil language Indian psychological thriller film written and directed by Ragavendra Prasad in his directorial debut. The film features Shabeer Kallarakkal, Aarvin and Pavithra in lead roles, with Rohini, Jayakumar, and Ravi Raghavendra playing supporting roles.

Plot 
The story covers the lives of five people who are interconnected through life situations, plotted in a house.

A burglar (Jayakumar) breaks and enters into a residential property. Just after he opens a safe to steal money and jewelry from the homeowners, he stumbles across a dangerous cat-and-mouse hostage situation inside the house. After the homeowner, Vinoth (Aarvin G.R.) returns home through the front entrance, another intruder, Vikram (Shabeer Kallarakkal) knocks him unconscious. When Vinoth regains consciousness, he discovers that he is chained to the stairs. The home intruder, Vikram, confronts him and coldly reveals his identity to the chained up captive.

Throughout a series of sequential flashbacks, it is discovered that Vikram developed an intense hatred towards Vinoth ever since childhood. As a former classmate and childhood rival, Vikram developed an inferiority complex and psychotic obsession with competing against Vinoth. Vikram eventually killed his own mother and ended up in a mental institution. As an adult, Vikram has now come to harm Vinoth in a state of jealous rage.

Flashing forward to the present, it is revealed that Vinoth's wife Anjali (Pavithra Gowda), who is now Vikram's hostage, is sitting tied to a chair with a strip of duct tape covering her mouth. Vikram threatens to mutilate Anjali unless Vinoth agrees to kill an unknown child inside the house. Vikram is determined to ensure that Vinoth kills the child so that he can finally bring Vinoth down to his level and claim that Vinoth is just as morally bankrupt as he is.

Vinoth pleads with Vikram not to harm his wife, but Vikram ends up chopping off two of Anjali's fingers when he still refuses to kill the child. Vikram also reveals that he is holding his own father (Ravi Raghavendra) as a hostage too, and threatens to kill him unless Vinoth cooperates with his demands. Unable to bear anything happening to the hostages, Vinoth apparently moves to kill the child. Thereafter, Vikram reveals that the child he killed was actually his (i.e. Vinoth's) son whom he had disguised as a girl. Anjali knew that the child was her and Vinoth's son, but she was unable to communicate this with her husband through the tape over her mouth.

Eventually the burglar, who was hiding inside the house the whole time, moves to attack Vinoth. Vinoth's father also attacks him. In a final showdown, Vinoth kills Vikram after plunging a knife into his neck. As he lies dying, Vikram triumphantly declares that he will tell his deceased mother that Vinoth is just as bad as he is. But unbeknownst to Vikram, Vinoth's son is still alive. Vikram dies, and the authorities arrive at the scene. Vinoth is reunited with his wife, who is now finally safe and sound.

Cast 
 Shabeer Kallarakkal as Vikram
 Aarvin G.R. as Vinoth
 Pavithra Gowda as Anjali
 Rohini as Teacher
 Ravi Raghavendra as Vikram's father
 Jayakumar as Thief
 Pasanga Sivakumar

Production 
Director Ragavendra Prasad relates that the concept came to him while working with Karthik Subbaraj in Pizza, and was inspired by the 2006 American-Mexican-French drama Babel. The title 54321 developed from the plot revolving around 5 people, their 4 lifestyles, the 3 murders within the plot-line, the 2-hour film length, and the 1 revenge within the tale.  During July 2015, the filming was reported as then being in progress. Joshua Sridhar composed the film's music.

Music 

The music was composed by Joshua Sridhar and was released at an event held at Prasad Lab, Chennai, on 31 April 2015.

Reception 
The film's released trailer received mixed response, which pleased the director.

M. Suganth of The Times of India opined that "And the film, too, never truly addresses the moral question at the heart of its plot — what makes one evil and is there difference between one evil act and another". Malini Mannath of The New Indian Express wrote that "54321 is opportunity lost!"

References

External links 
 

2010s Tamil-language films
2016 films
Indian thriller films
2016 directorial debut films
Films scored by Joshua Sridhar
2016 thriller films